Vladimir Mikhailovich Melanin (1 December 1933 – 10 August 1994) was a Soviet biathlete.

Life and career
He won an Olympic gold medal for the USSR in the 20 km individual in the 1964 Olympics in Innsbruck ahead of his fellow Soviet Aleksandr Privalov and the Norwegian Olav Jordet. Melanin also won three individual world titles in the 20 km, in 1959, 1962 and 1963.

Melanin started as a cross-country skier, but changed to biathlon while. His strong skiing base helped him win all his titles, as his shooting skills were mediocre. Because of poor shooting, he finished outside of the podium at his first Olympics in 1960. He improved a lot by the next Games, where he showed not only best skiing time, but also clean shooting. He finished more than 3 minutes ahead of his rivals, which remains the largest victory margin in any Olympic biathlon event. Domestically Melanin won only two titles, in the 20 km in 1959 and 1966. After retiring from competitions Melanin worked as a biathlon coach and managed a cross-country skiing and biathlon complex in Kirov Oblast. He received posthumously the International Biathlon Union Honorary Award.

Biathlon results
All results are sourced from the International Biathlon Union.

Olympic Games
1 medal (1 gold)

World Championships
7 medals (6 gold, 1 silver)

*During Olympic seasons competitions are only held for those events not included in the Olympic program.
**The team (time) event was removed in 1965, whilst the relay was added in 1966.

References

External links
 

1933 births
1994 deaths
Armed Forces sports society athletes
Soviet male biathletes
Biathletes at the 1960 Winter Olympics
Biathletes at the 1964 Winter Olympics
Olympic biathletes of the Soviet Union
Medalists at the 1964 Winter Olympics
Olympic medalists in biathlon
Olympic gold medalists for the Soviet Union
Biathlon World Championships medalists